Franc Hafner (born 9 February 1936) is a Yugoslav middle-distance runner. He competed in the men's 3000 metres steeplechase at the 1960 Summer Olympics.

References

1936 births
Living people
Athletes (track and field) at the 1960 Summer Olympics
Yugoslav male middle-distance runners
Yugoslav male steeplechase runners
Olympic athletes of Yugoslavia
Mediterranean Games bronze medalists for Yugoslavia
Mediterranean Games medalists in athletics
Athletes (track and field) at the 1959 Mediterranean Games
Sportspeople from Ljubljana